Orceana Calcio is an Italian association football team from Orzinuovi. It was founded in 1919. It took part to Serie C2 from 1978 to 1980.

Its most famous coach was Luigi Maifredi, that later coached Juventus F.C. and other important teams.

Association football clubs established in 1919
Football clubs in Lombardy
Serie C clubs
1919 establishments in Italy